Dendrographa austrosorediata is a species of saxicolous (rock-dwelling), crustose lichen in the family Roccellaceae. Found in Brazil, it was formally described as a new species in 2017 by André Aptroot and Emerson Luiz Gumboski. The type specimen was collected south of Prainha (São Francisco do Sul, Santa Catarina State); here, the lichen was found growing on coastal granite on overhanging rock faces in the lower supralittoral zone. It has a whitish-grey, crustose thallus that often joins with neighbouring thalli to create large areas that cover the stone substrate. Soredia are whitish to bluish grey but appear black when facing the light source. Neither apothecia nor pycnidia are present. Dendrographa austrosorediata contains erythrin and lecanoric acid, which are secondary compounds that can be detected with thin-layer chromatography.

References

Roccellaceae
Lichen species
Lichens described in 2017
Lichens of South Brazil
Taxa named by André Aptroot